The Rothwell scale, or Rothwell system, or Rothwell method, applied to incontinence care products, is a scale that shows how absorbent a particular incontinence pad or adult diaper is, and how much liquid it can absorb and hold before it is likely to leak due to overfill.

The system provides a quick reference for assessing how much liquid can be held by a sheet, pad or diaper, and therefore how appropriate it will be for a particular individual in any given circumstance.  The scale is based on the total absorbency test ISO 11948–1.  The scale runs from 1 to 22, with 1 indicating the least liquid absorbed, measured in grams, and 22 the most liquid absorbed.  The scale also applies a prefix to show what type of product is being referred to, with pads and sheets having an “I” prefix, and all in one diapers using a D prefix.

References
 M Fader, A Cottenden, K Getliffe, H Gage, S Clarke-O’Neill, K Jamieson, N Green, P Williams, R Brooks and J Malone-Lee, "Absorbent products for urinary/faecal incontinence: a comparative evaluation of key product designs", Health Technology Assessment, vol. 12, no. 29, 2008.
  A.M Cottenden, J.G Rothwell, H Leander, C Grau, R.J Brooks, "An investigation of the repeatability and reproducibility of ISO 11948-1 (the Rothwell method) for measuring the absorption capacity of incontinence pads", Medical Engineering & Physics, vol. 24, iss. 2, pp. 159–163, March 2002.
 ISO 11948-1:1996, "Urine-absorbing aids -- Part 1: Whole-product testing", International Organization for Standardization, 1996

Incontinence